Family & Friends is a studio album by American rapper Serengeti. It was released on Anticon in 2011.

Critical reception

At Metacritic, which assigns a weighted average score out of 100 to reviews from mainstream critics, the album received an average score of 78, based on 14 reviews, indicating "generally favorable reviews".

Brett Uddenberg of URB gave the album 5 out of 5 stars, saying: "Bleak and beautiful, Family & Friends is an absolute beast." Quentin B. Huff of PopMatters gave the album 8 out of 10 stars, calling it "Serengeti's most accessible and straightforward record."

Spin placed it at number 39 on the "40 Best Rap Albums of 2011" list. LA Weekly placed it at number 8 on the "Top 10 Los Angeles Albums of 2011" list.

Track listing

Personnel
Credits adapted from liner notes.

 Serengeti – vocals
 Yoni Wolf – production, backing vocals, mixing
 Advance Base – production, backing vocals, mixing
 Hazel Brown – backing vocals, handclaps
 Martha Brown – backing vocals, handclaps
 Eli Crews – mixing
 Daddy Kev – mastering
 Thomas Brendan – layout, design

References

External links
 

2011 albums
Serengeti (rapper) albums
Anticon albums